Project Catwalk is the Netherlands version of the reality show Project Runway.  Season 1 shown in 2007 and was won by Django Steenbakker. The show lasted 2 more seasons, for a total of 3 seasons, before being canceled.

External links
Official website

Netherlands
2007 Dutch television series debuts
2007 in fashion
Dutch fashion
2007 Dutch television series endings
Dutch reality television series
RTL 5 original programming